SoFly and Nius (stylized as soFLY and Nius) is a French  music production and songwriting duo signed to Artist Publishing Group (APG).

Members
SoFly and Nius is made up of:
Raphaël Judrin (artist name SoFly), born in Paris in 1985
Pierre-Antoine Melki (artist name Nius), born in Lyon in 1988
They regularly work with producer and songwriter Yoan "Oddfellow" Chirescu.

Career
Before joining each other, Nius had produced many tracks on M. Pokora's album Mise à jour, while SoFly was working on the Blue Tape projects with the rapper Vicelow.

In France, they worked with a great number of artists including Rohff, AKH, Soprano, M. Pokora, Amel Bent, Shy'm and with the music collective Mafia K-1 Fry.

Moving to the United States, they also produced for a number of American artists including Cory Gunz ("A Little Taste"), rapper Tony Yayo and T. Mills.

Very notably, they produced Justin Bieber's "Take You" from the album Believe and five tracks in Flo Rida's album Wild Ones, including the title track and international hit "Wild Ones", featuring Sia, and the fourth single "I Cry". They also produced Enrique Iglesias's single "Finally Found You". Prince Royce's "It's My Time" from the album Phase II

Their work has resulted in one Grammy Award nomination for 2013 Best Rap/Sung Collaboration (Wild Ones – Flo Rida featuring Sia).

They were also chosen to be part of the jury, along with Hype Williams, for the first edition of the Dubai International Music Awards in November 2013.

Discography

Singles 

 2011: Flo Rida – "Wild Ones" (feat. Sia)
 2012: Flo Rida – "Let It Roll"
 2012: Flo Rida – "I Cry"
 2012: Enrique Iglesias – "Finally Found You" (feat. Sammy Adams)
 2013: Flo Rida – "Sweet Spot" (feat. Jennifer Lopez)
 2013: Inna – Dame Tu Amor (feat. Reik)
 2014: Neon Jungle – Welcome to the Jungle
 2014: Danny Mercer – Who Are You Loving Now
 2015: Flo Rida – "I Don't Like It, I Love It" (feat. Robin Thicke)
 2017: Maître Gims – Loin  (feat. Dany Synthé, SoFly and Nius)
 2018: Flo Rida – Sweet Sensation
 2018: Mister V – Viano
 2018: Logan Henderson – Pull Me Deep
 2019: Austin Mahone – Anxious
 2019: Maitre Gims – Pirate (feat. J. Balvin)
 2019: Old Dominion – Young
 2020: Kyle – See You When I am Famous – 02. Money Now (feat. Tyga and Johnny Yukon)
 2021: Becky G and Burna Boy - Rotate
 2021: Starboi3 – Dick (feat. Doja Cat)

Video games

Songs 
2009: Timati – The Boss –  11. Love You (feat. Busta Rhymes and Mariya)
2011: T. Mills – Leaving Home –  07. Scandalous
2012: Flo Rida – Wild Ones – 5 tracks: 02. Wild Ones (feat. Sia), 03. Let It Roll, 06. Sweet Spot (feat. Jennifer Lopez), 08. I Cry, 10. Let It Roll, Pt 2 (feat. Lil Wayne)
2012: Justin Bieber – Believe –  05. Take You
2012: Enrique Iglesias – TBD – 00. Finally Found You (feat. Sammy Adams)
2012: Pitbull – Global Warming – 10. Tchu Tchu Tcha (feat. Enrique Iglesias)
2013: Inna – Party Never Ends – 2 tracks: Dame Tu Amor (feat. Reik), Light Up (feat. Reik)
2013: Rich Gang – Rich Gang –  12. Angel (feat. Mystikal, Jae Millz, Ace Hood, Gudda Gudda, Birdman & Mack Maine)
2013: B.o.B – Underground Luxury – 7. Coastline
2014: Kid Ink – My Own Lane –  12. No Miracles (feat. Elle Varner and Machine Gun Kelly)*
2014: Timeflies – After Hours – 06. All The Way
2014: Neon Jungle – Welcome to the Jungle – 02. Welcome to the Jungle
2014: Future – Honest – 14. Side Effect
 2014: Danny Mercer – TBD – 00. Who Are You Loving Now
 2015: Flo Rida – My House (EP) – 03. I Don't Like It, I Love It (feat. Robin Thicke)
 2015: Flo Rida – TBD – Dirty Mind (feat. Sam Martin)
 2015: Robin Schulz – Sugar – 07. Pride (feat. SoFly and Nius)**
 2015: Furious 7 – Furious 7 OST – Francoise
 2016: Flo Rida – TBD – 00. Dirty Mind (feat. Sam Martin)
 2016: The Lonely Island – Popstar: Never Stop Never Stopping Soundtrack – 03. Equal Rights (feat. P!nk)*
 2017: J Sutta – I Say Yes – 13. Feel Nothing (feat. Hopsin)
 2017: Loïc Nottet – Selfocracy – 04. Dirty (feat. Lil Trip)*
 2017: Maître Gims – Loin  (feat. Dany Synthé, SoFly and Nius)**
 2018: Flo Rida – Sweet Sensation
 2018: Mister V – Viano
 2018: Maty Noyes – New Friends
 2018: Katelyn Tarver – Labels, Kool Aid
 2018: Logan Henderson – Pull Me Deep
 2019: Austin Mahone – Anxious
 2019: Starboi3 – One More Time
 2019: Maitre Gims – Pirate (feat. J. Balvin)
 2019: Old Dominion – Young
 2020: Rome Castille – Far From Home
 2020: Kyle – See You When I Am Famous – 02. Money Now (feat. Tyga and Johnny Yukon)
 2021: Becky G & Burna Boy - Rotate
 2021: Tink - Might Let You (feat. Davido)
 2021: Starboi3 – Dick (feat. Doja Cat)
 2021: Mohamed Ramadan – Ya Habibi (feat. Gims)
Notes
* (additional strings from Yoan "Oddfellow" Chirescu)
** (as featured artists)

References

External links
Raphaël Judrin on LesCharts
Pierre-Antoine Melki on LesCharts
SoFly on LesCharts
Nius on LesCharts

French record producers
French hip hop record producers
Record production duos
French musical duos
Hip hop duos